Pooh or Winnie-the-Pooh is a fictional teddy bear created by A.A. Milne and subsequently featured in films and TV adaptations.

Pooh may also refer to:

People 
 Ritsuko Pooh (born 1960), Japanese obstetrician and gynecologist

Nickname
 Pooh Richardson (born 1966), American former National Basketball Association player
 Pooh Williamson (born 1973), former college basketball player and interim head coach at the University of Tulsa
 Clarence "Pooh Bear" Williams (1975–2022), former American football fullback
 Eugene "Pooh" Jeter (born 1983), American professional basketball player in Ukraine

Stage name
 DJ Pooh (born 1969), American record producer, rapper, screenwriter and film director
 Pooh-Man (born 1971), also known as MC Pooh, an American rap artist
 Pooh (comedian) (born 1974), Filipino singer and comedian
 Big Pooh (born 1980), American rapper and member of the hip hop group Little Brother
 Pooh Shiesty, American rapper

Other uses
 Pooh, including Winnie, a pair of ex-naval guns emplaced near Dover; see Cross-Channel guns in the Second World War
 Pooh (band), a 1966 Italian rock band
 Feces, the solid or semisolid digestion remains

See also
 Poo (disambiguation)
 Poop (disambiguation)

Lists of people by nickname